Volker Wissing (born 22 April 1970) is a German lawyer, former judge and politician of the liberal Free Democratic Party (FDP) who has been serving as the party's General Secretary since 2020, and as Minister for Transport in the federal government under Chancellor Olaf Scholz since 2021. He previously was the Deputy Minister-President of Rhineland-Palatinate in the state government under Minister-President Malu Dreyer from 2016 to 2021 and a member of the German Parliament from 2004 to 2013.

Early life and education 
Wissing was born 1970 in the German town of Landau in der Pfalz and studied law at the Saarland University.

Wissing achieved a law degree and worked for some time as a judge before he entered professional politics.

Political career

Career in national politics
Wissing entered the FDP in 1998. He became a member of the German Bundestag in 2004 when he took the seat of Marita Sehn who had died in a car accident. From 2004 until 2013, he served on the Finance Committee; he chaired the committee from 2009 until 2013. From 2011 until 2013, he also served as one of his parliamentary group's deputy chairpersons, under the leadership of chairman Rainer Brüderle.

In the negotiations to form a coalition government of the FDP and the Christian Democrats (CDU together with the Bavarian CSU) following the 2009 federal elections, Wissing was part of the FDP delegation in the working group on financial policy and taxes, led by Thomas de Maizière und Hermann Otto Solms.

Career in state politics
On the state level, Wissing became chairman of the party's branch in Rhineland-Palatinate in 2011 succeeding Rainer Brüderle. He led the Free Democratic Party back into the Landtag of Rhineland-Palatinate in the 2016 state election. After coalition negotiations Wissing became Deputy Minister President and State Minister for Economics, Transport, Agriculture and Viticulture in Malu Dreyer's second cabinet.

In 2020 FDP leader Christian Lindner nominated Wissing to serve as General Secretary of the party, succeeding Linda Teuteberg. Subsequently, Wissing announced his switch for state politics to the federal arena, announcing his candidacy for the Bundestag in the 2021 federal election.

Minister of Digital Affairs and Transport, 2021–present
On 24 November 2021, Wissing was nominated by the Federal Executive Committee of the FDP for the post of Federal Ministry of Transport and Digital Infrastructure in the designated federal government. He took office as Transport Minister on 8 December as the Scholz cabinet was sworn in.

Early in his tenure, Wissing ordered the blocking of German airspace for Russian aircraft in response to the 2022 Russian invasion of Ukraine.

In July 2022, he delivered his plans to meet emissions reductions targets in the German transport sector, shortly before the deadline. The scientific committee tasked with assessing the sufficiency of his proposed measures declared the plan entirely insufficient and decided not even to evaluate it, given there was "nothing to be evaluated".

Other activities

Corporate boards 
 KfW, Ex-Officio Member of the Board of Supervisory Directors (since 2021)

Non-profit organizations 
 German-Jordanian Society, Member of the Parliamentary Advisory Board
 Association of German Foundations, Member of the Parliamentary Advisory Board (2005-2013)

Personal life 
Wissing is married and has a daughter. The family lives in Bad Bergzabern and Berlin's Prenzlauer Berg district.

References 

Living people
1970 births
20th-century German politicians
21st-century German politicians
Members of the Landtag of Rhineland-Palatinate
Saarland University alumni
20th-century German judges
Members of the Bundestag 2002–2005
Members of the Bundestag 2005–2009
Members of the Bundestag 2009–2013
Members of the Bundestag 2021–2025
Members of the Bundestag for the Free Democratic Party (Germany)
Transport ministers of Germany